Thomas James Samson, FBA (born 1946), commonly known as Jim Samson, is a musicologist, music critic and retired academic. Educated at Queen's University Belfast (BMus) and University College, Cardiff (MMus, PhD), he was appointed to a research fellowship at the University of Leicester in 1972. He moved to the University of Exeter in 1973 as a lecturer; promotions followed, to reader in 1987 and Professor of Musicology in 1992. In 1994, he was appointed Stanley Hugh Badock Professor of Music at the University of Bristol, and was then Professor of Music at Royal Holloway, University of London, between 2002 and 2011.

Honours and awards 
Samson was awarded the Order of Merit by the Polish government in 1990 and was elected a Fellow of the British Academy, the United Kingdom's national academy, in 2000. In 2018, he received the IRC Harrison Medal from the Society for Musicology in Ireland.

Selected publications 
 Music in Transition: A Study of the Tonal Expansion and Early Atonality, 1900–1920 (Dent, 1977; reprinted in 1993).
 The Music of Szymanowski (Kahn and Averill, 1980).
 The Music of Chopin (Routledge and Kegan Paul, 1985; reprinted by Clarendon Press, 1994).
 Chopin: The Four Ballades (Cambridge University Press, 1992).
 (Editor) The Cambridge Companion to Chopin (Cambridge University Press, 1992).
 Chopin (Oxford University Press, 1996).
 (Editor) The Cambridge History of Nineteenth-Century Music (Cambridge University Press, 2002).
 Virtuosity and the Musical Work: the Transcendental Studies of Liszt (Cambridge University Press, 2003).
 (Edited with J. P. E. Harper-Scott) Introduction to Music Studies (Cambridge University Press, 2008).
Music in the Balkans (Brill, 2013).
 (Edited with Nicoletta Demetriou) Music in Cyprus (Routledge, 2015).

References 

 

 
 
 

Living people
1946 births
British musicologists
Alumni of Queen's University Belfast
Alumni of Cardiff University
Academics of the University of Leicester
Academics of the University of Exeter
Academics of the University of Bristol
Academics of Royal Holloway, University of London
Fellows of the British Academy
Chopin scholars